Francisco Javier Sánchez González (born January 30, 1973) is a Mexican football manager and former player.

References

External links
 

1973 births
Living people
Mexican footballers
Association football defenders
C.F. Cobras de Querétaro players
Club América footballers
Inter de Tijuana footballers
Tigres UANL footballers
Liga MX players
Mexican football managers
Footballers from Mexico City
Footballers at the 1996 Summer Olympics
Olympic footballers of Mexico